Natalya Nikolayevna Antyukh (born 26 June 1981) is a Russian sprinter who specializes in the 400 metres and 400 metres hurdles. She won the bronze medal in the 400 metres and a silver for the 4 × 400 m relay at the 2004 Summer Olympics in Athens.

She is currently serving a four-year suspension from 2021 to 2025 for anti-doping rule violations. Her results from 15 July 2012 onwards had been disqualified, including her 2012 Olympic gold medal in the 400 metres hurdles.

According to World Athletics, she last competed in 2016.

Background
Her younger brother Kirill Antyukh is a former competitive sprinter, who turned to bobsleigh, and was part of the reserve Russian squad for the 2014 Winter Olympics.

Career

2004: Double Olympic medalist at 23 years old
Leading up to the 2004 Summer Olympics, Antyukh achieved a personal best time of 49.85 seconds in the 400 metres at the year's Russian Championships in Tula to place second. At the 2004 Summer Olympics in Athens, Greece, she won the bronze medal in the 400 metres with a time of 49.89 seconds, which was 0.48 seconds slower than gold medalist Tonique Williams-Darling of the Bahamas. Four days later, she won the silver medal for the 4×400 m relay with a final relay time of 3:20.16. Six years later, at the 2010 European Championships in Barcelona, Spain, she won the gold medal in the 400 metre hurdles with a personal best time of 52.92 seconds.

2012: Olympic champion at 31 years old
On 8 August 2012, Antyukh, then 31 years old, won the gold medal in the 400 metres hurdles at the 2012 Olympic Games in London, with a personal best time of 52.70 seconds. Three days later, she won the silver medal for the 4×400 m relay, helping finish in a time of 3 minutes, 20.23 seconds. She received the Russian Order of Honour after the Olympics for her performances.

2016: Teammate disqualified, stripped of her 2012 Olympic silver medal
In 2016, Antyukh's silver medal in the 4×400 m relay from the 2012 Olympic Games was stripped, with medals reallocated to relay teams from Jamaica (silver) and Ukraine (bronze), after teammate Antonina Krivoshapka had her results from the event disqualified. In 2019, all Russians, including Antyukh, were banned by the World Anti-Doping Agency from competing in international track and field events representing Russia for a four year period.

2020–2022: Disqualified, stripped of her 2012 Olympic gold medal
In 2020, Antyukh was among four Russian track and field athletes charged with doping offences, facing charges of using a prohibited substance or method. The Athletics Integrity Unit said the cases were based on an investigation into Russian doping for the World Anti-Doping Agency presented in 2016 by Canadian lawyer Richard McLaren. Her ban was confirmed on 7 April 2021 by the Court of Arbitration for Sport when she was suspended from athletics for four years, to 2025, with all her results from 30 June 2013 onwards disqualified. In October 2022, more than 10 years and 2 months after the race, her results from July 2012 to June 2013 were disqualified, stripping her of the gold medal in the 400 m hurdles at the 2012 Summer Olympics, with the new recipient being the former silver medalist, American Lashinda Demus.

The stripping of her gold medal marked the attainment of stripping all Russians who won a gold medal in track at the 2012 Summer Olympics of their gold medal(s).

In addition to being banned for anti-doping rule violations, Antyukh, along with all other Russian and Belarusian athletes, was subjected to another ban starting 1 March 2022, which excluded her from all World Athletics competitions with no communicated end date and was implemented in response to the 2022 Russian invasion of Ukraine, part of the ongoing Russo-Ukrainian War that began in 2014.

Achievements
All information from World Athletics profile.

International competitions

Personal bests
 200 metres – 22.75 (-0.2 m/s, Tula 2004)
 400 metres – 49.85 (Tula 2004)
 400 metres indoor – 50.37 (Moscow 2006)
 400 m hurdles – 52.92 (Barcelona 2010)

See also
List of doping cases in athletics
List of Olympic medalists in athletics (women)
List of 2004 Summer Olympics medal winners
List of World Athletics Championships medalists (women)
List of European Athletics Championships medalists (women)
List of European Athletics Indoor Championships medalists (women)
400 metres at the Olympics
400 metres hurdles at the Olympics
4 × 400 metres relay at the Olympics
400 metres hurdles at the World Championships in Athletics
4 × 400 metres relay at the World Championships in Athletics
List of people from Saint Petersburg
List of Russian sportspeople

References

External links

 

1981 births
Living people
Athletes from Saint Petersburg
Russian female sprinters
Russian female hurdlers
Olympic female sprinters
Olympic female hurdlers
Olympic athletes of Russia
Olympic silver medalists for Russia
Olympic bronze medalists for Russia
Olympic silver medalists in athletics (track and field)
Olympic bronze medalists in athletics (track and field)
Athletes (track and field) at the 2004 Summer Olympics
Athletes (track and field) at the 2012 Summer Olympics
Medalists at the 2004 Summer Olympics
Competitors stripped of Summer Olympics medals
World Athletics Championships athletes for Russia
World Athletics Championships medalists
World Athletics Championships winners
World Athletics Indoor Championships winners
European Athletics Championships winners
European Athletics Championships medalists
European Athletics Indoor Championships winners
Russian Athletics Championships winners
Russian sportspeople in doping cases
Doping cases in athletics
Recipients of the Order of Honour (Russia)